The name Karen has been used for seventeen tropical cyclones worldwide: six in the Atlantic Ocean, nine in the Western Pacific Ocean, one in the South-West Indian Ocean, and one in the Australian region.

In the Atlantic:
 Tropical Storm Karen (1989), formed near Isla de la Juventud
 Tropical Storm Karen (1995), minimal storm that was absorbed by Hurricane Iris
 Hurricane Karen (2001), made landfall at Nova Scotia as a tropical storm
 Hurricane Karen (2007), Category 1 hurricane in the tropical Atlantic
 Tropical Storm Karen (2013), formed in the Gulf of Mexico
 Tropical Storm Karen (2019), briefly affected Puerto Rico before moving out to sea

In the Western Pacific storms:
 Typhoon Karen (1948) (T4801), remained over open waters
 Typhoon Karen (1952) (T5209), struck South Korea and Japan
 Typhoon Karen-Lucille (1956) (T5619), crossed northern Philippines
 Typhoon Karen (1960) (T6001, 06W), left 56 dead and 7,000 homeless in the Philippines
 Typhoon Karen (1962) (T6228, 84W), destroyed 95% of the buildings on Guam
 Typhoon Rananim (2004) (T0413, 16W, Karen), struck China
 Typhoon Nuri (2008) (T0812, 13W, Karen), struck the Philippines and Hong Kong
 Typhoon Sanba (2012) (T1216, 17W, Karen), Category 5 super typhoon that made landfall in South Korea
 Typhoon Sarika (2016) (T1621, 24W, Karen), destructive Category 4 typhoon that struck the Philippines, South China, and Vietnam

Karen was retired from the PAGASA after the 2016 typhoon season and was replaced with Kristine.

In the South-West Indian:
 Cyclone Karen (1964)

In the Australia region:
 Cyclone Karen (1977)

Atlantic hurricane set index articles
Pacific typhoon set index articles
South-West Indian Ocean cyclone set index articles
Australian region cyclone set index articles